Rosemary Kathleen Lavelle (born May 14, 1995) is an American professional soccer player who plays as a midfielder for OL Reign of the National Women's Soccer League (NWSL), and for the United States national team.

Lavelle represented the United States at multiple youth levels before making her senior international debut in 2017. After finishing her collegiate career with the Wisconsin Badgers in 2016, Lavelle began her professional career with Boston Breakers before moving to Washington Spirit a year later. She started six games for the United States at the 2019 World Cup, scoring three goals, and was awarded the Bronze Ball. The same year, she was named the sixth best player in the world at The Best FIFA Football Awards 2019 and was named to the 2019 FIFA FIFPro World XI. In the 2020 Olympics, she scored one goal for the United States on the way to a bronze medal.

Early life 
Lavelle was born in Cincinnati, Ohio, to parents Marty and Janet, and was raised with three siblings, John, Nora and Mary. She played competitive soccer initially with GSSA Sycamore United Club before moving to Lakota United Soccer Club and later with Cincinnati United Premier Soccer Club. She credits her love of soccer to long-time Cincinnati Soccer Trainer Neil Bradford, who began as her trainer at age 8 and predicted her rise to the Women's Soccer National Team as a youth. As part of a third-grade book report, Lavelle chose to write about professional soccer star Mia Hamm.

A four-year varsity girls' soccer player at Mount Notre Dame High School, Lavelle was named Cincinnati's Player of the Year by The Cincinnati Enquirer her senior year. The same year, she scored 15 goals (38 points) for her team. Lavelle finished her high school career as the team's leading scorer with 57 goals. She was twice-named NSCAA All-Region, as a junior and senior, and received first-team all-state honors. She was awarded the Greater Cincinnati/Northern Kentucky Sports Women of the Year award in 2013.

Wisconsin Badgers, 2013–2016
Lavelle was accepted to play college soccer at the University of Wisconsin–Madison in 2013. A four-year starter, Lavelle made 19 appearances as a freshman, scoring 6 goals and registering 7 assists on the way to being named Big Ten Conference Freshman of the Year. Wisconsin won the Big Ten Women's Soccer Tournament in 2014. Lavelle was named Big Ten midfielder of the year consecutively in 2015 and 2016. In 2015, she was also named first-team All-American by the National Soccer Coaches Association of America (NSCAA), the first Wisconsin Badger to do so since 1991.

Summer Leagues, 2014–2016
Lavelle played with the Dayton Dutch Lions in the USL W-League during the 2014 season. During her college break in the summer of 2015, Lavelle played for the Seattle Sounders Women of the W-League, where she was named all-league.
After the W-League folded she returned to the Lions for the 2016 Women's Premier Soccer League season.

Professional career

Boston Breakers, 2017
On January 12, 2017, Lavelle was selected number one overall at the 2017 NWSL College Draft by the Boston Breakers. Lavelle started her professional career by scoring two goals in eight games and was named Player of the Month for April. However, after suffering a hamstring injury in June while on international duty, Lavelle missed over two months and finished the season with only ten appearances as a rookie. The Breakers folded before the start of the 2018 season.

Washington Spirit, 2018–2020
A dispersal draft was held by the NWSL to distribute Breakers players across the league. Lavelle was selected first overall by Washington Spirit, who acquired the first pick through a trade with Sky Blue FC. Due to injury and international duty Lavelle appeared in only eleven games for the Spirit in 2018. Despite making only six appearances the following year due to international duty, scoring one goal and recording one assist, Lavelle was named to the 2019 NWSL Best XI in the end of the season awards. With the 2020 season affected by the COVID-19 pandemic, Lavelle took part in the 2020 NWSL Challenge Cup, making four appearances and scoring one goal as Washington finished second in the preliminary group but were eliminated in the first knockout round by Sky Blue FC on penalties.

On August 16, 2020, Lavelle was traded to OL Reign in exchange for OL Reign's natural first-round pick in the 2022 NWSL College Draft, $100,000 in allocation money, and further performance-based allocation money with the acknowledgement that she would be signing outside the league.

Manchester City, 2020–2021
On August 18, 2020, Lavelle signed with Manchester City of the English FA WSL ahead of the 2020–21 season. She scored her first goal on October 7, 2020 in a 3–1 win over Everton in the 2020–21 FA Women's League Cup, scoring her second goal against Liverpool a month later in the same competition. On January 31, 2021, Lavelle scored her first WSL goal as a substitute during City's 4–0 win over West Ham United.

OL Reign, 2021–present
On May 17, 2021, OL Reign announced the return of Lavelle to the NWSL as an allocated player having acquired her playing rights prior to her move to England in August 2020.

International career
Lavelle represented the United States at multiple youth levels. On November 24, 2015, Lavelle was called up to train with the senior United States women's national soccer team. One of eight players who joined the team's Victory Tour following the 2015 Women's World Cup, she earned her first senior international cap on March 4, 2017, during a match against England at the 2017 SheBelieves Cup. She was named Player of the Match following the team's 1–0 loss.

2019 FIFA Women's World Cup
In September 2018, Lavelle was named to the national team roster for the 2018 CONCACAF Women's Championship, the qualifying tournament for the 2019 FIFA Women's World Cup. She appeared in all five games for the U.S. and scored three goals. Her final goal of the tournament was scored in the second minute of the championship game against Canada, helping the U.S to a 2–0 victory, and their second straight CONCACAF Championship.

Lavelle started six games for the U.S. at the 2019 FIFA Women's World Cup in France, scored three goals, and was awarded the Bronze Ball at the FIFA Women's World Cup awards as the third best player in the tournament. During the team's first group stage match against Thailand, Lavelle scored a brace helping the U.S. win 13–0. During the U.S. knockout round match against Spain, she drew a penalty kick that was converted by Megan Rapinoe to seal the team's 2–1 win and advance to the quarterfinals. Lavelle scored the U.S.' second goal in the final against the Netherlands helping the team win 2–0.

Lavelle was named one of the world's top 11 players by The Best FIFA Football Awards 2019 (finishing sixth), and was chosen as one of the world's top three midfielders by her professional peers in the 2019 FIFA FIFPro World XI.

2020 Summer Olympics
In July 2021, she was named to the roster for the delayed 2020 Tokyo Olympics. Lavelle appeared in all six games as the team won the bronze medal, losing to Canada 1–0 in the semi-final before beating Australia 4–3 in the third-place playoff. She scored one goal at the tournament, during a 6–1 group stage win over New Zealand.

Personal life and endorsements
Rose has a pet bulldog named Wilma Jean Wrinkles.

In 2020, Lavelle was named a brand ambassador for FLIGHT by Yuengling, a premium light beer.

Career statistics

Club

International

International goals
 As of match played January 21, 2023. United States score listed first, score column indicates score after each Lavelle goal.

World Cup appearances

Olympic appearances

Honors
Wisconsin Badgers
 Big Ten Women's Soccer Tournament: 2014
Manchester City
Women's FA Cup: 2019–20

OL Reign
 NWSL Shield: 2022
 The Women's Cup: 2022
United States
 FIFA Women's World Cup: 2019
Olympic Bronze Medal: 2020
 CONCACAF Women's Championship: 2018; 2022 
 CONCACAF Women's Olympic Qualifying Tournament: 2020
 Tournament of Nations: 2018
 SheBelieves Cup: 2020; 2021; 2022; 2023
Individual
 Big Ten Freshman of the Year: 2013
 All-Big Ten Freshman Team: 2013
 First Team All-Big Ten: 2013, 2014, 2015, 2016
 Big Ten Midfielder of the Year: 2015, 2016
 NSCAA First Team All-American: 2015
 NSCAA Second Team All-American: 2014, 2016
 2014 CONCACAF Women's U-20 Championship Golden Ball
 FIFA Women's World Cup Bronze Ball: 2019
 IFFHS Women's World Team: 2019
 National Women's Soccer League Best XI: 2019
 Best Player SheBelieves Cup: 2021
 CONCACAF W Championship Best XI: 2022

See also
 List of people from Cincinnati
 List of Keys to the City in the United States
 List of University of Wisconsin–Madison people in athletics

References

Further reading 
 Grainey, Timothy (2012), Beyond Bend It Like Beckham: The Global Phenomenon of Women's Soccer, University of Nebraska Press, 
 Lisi, Clemente A. (2010), The U.S. Women's Soccer Team: An American Success Story, Scarecrow Press, 
 Schultz, Jaime (2014), Qualifying Times: Points of Change in U.S. Women's Sport, University of Illinois Press, 
 Stay, Shane (2019), The Women's World Cup 2019 Book: Everything You Need to Know About the Soccer World Cup, Books on Demand, 
 Theivam, Keiran and Jeff Kassouf (2019), The Making of the Women's World Cup: Defining stories from a sport's coming of age, Little, 
 Walters, Meg (2019), World Cup Women: Megan, Alex, and the Team USA Soccer Champs, Simon and Schuster,

External links
 
 US Soccer player profile
 
 Washington Spirit player profile
 Boston Breakers player profile
 Wisconsin Badgers player profile
 
 

1995 births
2019 FIFA Women's World Cup players
American women's soccer players
Boston Breakers draft picks
Boston Breakers players
Living people
National Women's Soccer League players
Soccer players from Cincinnati
United States women's international soccer players
United States women's under-20 international soccer players
Washington Spirit players
Wisconsin Badgers women's soccer players
Women's association football midfielders
FIFA Women's World Cup-winning players
Manchester City W.F.C. players
Women's Super League players
American expatriate sportspeople in England
Expatriate women's footballers in England
Footballers at the 2020 Summer Olympics
Olympic bronze medalists for the United States in soccer
Medalists at the 2020 Summer Olympics
OL Reign players